The 1981–82 Gonzaga Bulldogs men's basketball team represented Gonzaga University in the West Coast Athletic Conference (WCAC) during the 1981–82 NCAA Division I men's basketball season. Led by newly-promoted first-year head coach Jay Hillock, the Bulldogs were  overall (7–7 in WCAC, tied for fourth), and played their home games on campus at Kennedy Pavilion in Spokane, Washington.

Point guard John Stockton was a sophomore this season.

For a second season, the GU cheerleaders were assisted at home games by Captain Zag.

References

External links
Sports Reference – Gonzaga Bulldogs men's basketball – 1981-82 season

Gonzaga Bulldogs men's basketball seasons
Gonzaga
1981 in sports in Washington (state)
1982 in sports in Washington (state)